Lady from Edinburgh is a 1945 comedy play by the British writers Aimée Stuart and L. Arthur Rose. A Scottish aunt arrives to oversee her family's affairs in Mayfair.

It premiered at His Majesty's Theatre in Aberdeen before transferring to the Playhouse Theatre in London's West End where it ran for 560 performances from 10 April 1945 to 10 August 1946. The original London cast included Dulcie Gray, Sophie Stewart, Ethel Coleridge, Henry Hewitt, Richard Bird and Alan Haines.

References

Bibliography
 Wearing, J.P. The London Stage 1940-1949: A Calendar of Productions, Performers, and Personnel.  Rowman & Littlefield,  2014.

1945 plays
West End plays
Comedy plays
Plays by Aimée Stuart
Plays set in London